Black Paladins is an album by American jazz saxophonist Joseph Jarman and percussionist Don Moye featuring Johnny Dyani recorded in 1979 for the Italian Black Saint label.

Reception
The Allmusic review by Brian Olewnick awarded the album 4½ stars stating "Black Paladins was the Jarman/Moye duo's most successful effort, and one of the most rewarding projects either was involved with outside of the Art Ensemble. A delicious recording".

Track listing
All compositions by Joseph Jarman except as indicated
 "Mama Marimba" (Johnny Dyani) - 3:22
 "In Memory of My Seasons" - 6:20
 "Humility in the Light of the Creator" (Kalaparusha Maurice McIntyre) - 8:33
 "Black Paladins" (Henry Dumas, Jarman) - 8:04
 "Ginger Song" - 2:54
 "Ode to Wilbur Ware" (Don Moye) - 8:07
Recorded at Barigozzi Studio in Milano, Italy on December 19 & 20, 1979

Personnel
Joseph Jarman - sopranino saxophone, tenor saxophone, baritone saxophone, conch shell, flute, bamboo flute, frog flute, bass clarinet, voice
Don Moye - drums, donno, chekere, conch shell, congas, rattle, bendir, whistles, trap drums, bird calls
Johnny Dyani - piano, bass, tambourine, voice

References

Black Saint/Soul Note albums
Don Moye albums
Joseph Jarman albums
1979 albums